Lester E. Holt (1889 – 1918) was an American pioneer aviator and later an Army instructor. He trained in the Curtiss Model D pusher type of plane.

Death
In 1918 Holt was an Army flight instructor. He had been in the Army for four years. On June 30 at Dayton, Ohio, while flight testing an airplane, he crashed from a height of 1,200 feet. His body was crushed by the plane's engine.

References

External links
Earlyaviators.com

1889 births
1918 deaths
Accidental deaths in Ohio
Aviators killed in aviation accidents or incidents in the United States
Victims of aviation accidents or incidents in 1918